Less Browne (born December 7, 1959) is a former American football defensive back who played in the United States Football League and the Canadian Football League for the Pittsburgh Maulers (USFL), the Hamilton Tiger-Cats, the Winnipeg Blue Bombers, the Ottawa Rough Riders and the BC Lions.

Professional career
Browne originally signed as a pro with the USFL's the Pittsburgh Maulers after being drafted in the 13th round (284th overall) by the expansion club in the 1984 Draft (January 4, 1984).

Browne signed a contract with the Maulers and started the season on their roster, however, was never activated for game action.  He was released after the second week of the season by the Maulers on March 6, 1984 and later that spring signed with the CFL Hamilton Tiger-Cats.

Browne holds the CFL and all-pro records for most interceptions in a career with 87.  He also holds the record for most interception return yards with 1,508.  Browne ranks third in the CFL for career blocked kicks with eight. Browne played in four Grey Cup games (1985, 1986, 1990, and 1994), winning the latter three. He was a six-time CFL All-Star, and was twice runner-up for the CFL's Most Outstanding Defensive Player Award, in 1986 by the Hamilton Tiger-Cats and in 1994 by the BC Lions.

Post-career
He was inducted into the Canadian Football Hall of Fame in 2002 and in November, 2006 was voted one of the CFL's Top 50 players (#23) of the league's modern era by Canadian sports network The Sports Network/TSN.

He later became an assistant coach for the Winnipeg Blue Bombers.

External links
 

≈

1959 births
Living people
BC Lions players
Canadian football defensive backs
Canadian Football League announcers
Colorado State Rams football players
Hamilton Tiger-Cats players
Ottawa Rough Riders players
Pittsburgh Maulers players
Winnipeg Blue Bombers coaches
Winnipeg Blue Bombers players
Canadian Football Hall of Fame inductees
People from East Liverpool, Ohio
Players of American football from Ohio
African-American coaches of Canadian football
African-American players of Canadian football
21st-century African-American people
20th-century African-American sportspeople